Miguel Ángel Fernández-Palacios Martínez (born on 1 October 1965), is a Spanish politician and diplomat who is currently the Ambassador to NATO since September 2018.

He has also been Spain's ambassador to the Democratic Republic of the Congo and Ethiopia, with concurrence also in the Seychelles and Djibouti.

Biography

Miguel Ángel Fernández-Palacios was born in Las Palmas de Gran Canaria on 1 October 1965.

He completed his primary and secondary studies at the Colegio Oficial Alemán in Las Palmas de Gran Canaria and later graduated in law at the Complutense University of Madrid, where he completed his Doctorate in Law. He also obtained a diploma in European Relations from the Catholic Institute of Paris.

In his early diplomatic career, he was assigned to the Spanish diplomatic missions in Algiers, The Hague, and Tegucigalpa.

He has been head of the United Nations and Western Europe area at the Ministry of Foreign Affairs, and advisor for International Affairs to the Ministry of Defence. In June 2005, he was appointed director of the cabinet of the defense minister.

In 2006, Fernández-Palacios was appointed ambassador of Spain in the Democratic Republic of the Congo.

In 2008, he was General Director of the Cabinet of the President of the Congress of Deputies, José Bono.

From 2011 to 2015, Fernández-Palacios was Ambassador of Spain  Ethiopia, Djibouti and Seychelles, as well as Permanent Representative Observer to the African Union.

In March 2017, the diplomatic staff of the Spanish Embassy in Kinshasa was evacuated after the headquarters was hit by a shell. Ambassador Miguel Ángel Fernández-Palacios and the rest of the officials were evicted in tanks by Uruguayan soldiers from the UN mission, amid a hail of gunfire. The evacuees were sheltered in a building under the United Nations flag.

He held the position of Counselor for Parliamentary Affairs in the Permanent Representation of Spain to the European Union.

In September 2018, Fernández-Palacios became the ambassador to NATO.

References

1965 births
Living people
Spanish politicians
Spanish diplomats
Permanent Representatives of Spain to NATO
Ambassadors of Spain to Ethiopia
Ambassadors of Spain to the Democratic Republic of the Congo
Ambassadors of Spain to Seychelles
Ambassadors of Spain to Djibouti
People from Las Palmas